The 154th Ohio Infantry Regiment, sometimes 154th Ohio Volunteer Infantry (or 154th OVI) was an infantry regiment in the Union Army during the American Civil War.

Service
The 154th Ohio Infantry was organized at Camp Dennison near Cincinnati, Ohio, and mustered in May 8, 1864, for 100 days service under the command of Colonel Robert Stevenson.

The regiment left Ohio for New Creek, West Virginia, May 12. It served guard and picket duty at New Creek until May 29. (Company F detached at Piedmont May 22 to August 22.) It moved to Greenland Gap May 29 and was involved in a skirmish near Moorefield June 4. (One company detached at Youghiogheny Bridge until July 25.) The regiment engaged in numerous scouting expeditions until July 25 when it moved to New Creek. After action at New Creek August 4, it moved to Camp Chase, Columbus, Ohio, August 10 to guard prisoners. It then moved to Camp Dennison August 22.

The 154th Ohio Infantry mustered out of service September 1, 1864, at Camp Dennison.

Ohio National Guard
Over 35,000 Ohio National Guardsmen were federalized and organized into regiments for 100 days service in May 1864. Shipped to the Eastern Theater, they were designed to be placed in "safe" rear areas to protect railroads and supply points, thereby freeing regular troops for Lt. Gen. Ulysses S. Grant’s push on the Confederate capital of Richmond, Virginia. As events transpired, many units found themselves in combat, stationed in the path of Confederate Gen. Jubal Early’s veteran Army of the Valley during its famed Valley Campaigns of 1864. Ohio Guard units met the battle-tested foe head on and helped blunt the Confederate offensive thereby saving Washington, D.C. from capture. Ohio National Guard units participated in the battles of Monacacy, Fort Stevens, Harpers Ferry, and in the siege of Petersburg.

Casualties
The regiment lost 4 enlisted men during service; 1 man killed, 3 men died due to disease.

Commanders
 Colonel Robert Stevenson

See also

 List of Ohio Civil War units
 Ohio in the Civil War

References
 Dyer, Frederick H. A Compendium of the War of the Rebellion (Des Moines, IA:  Dyer Pub. Co.), 1908.
 Ohio Roster Commission. Official Roster of the Soldiers of the State of Ohio in the War on the Rebellion, 1861–1865, Compiled Under the Direction of the Roster Commission (Akron, OH: Werner Co.), 1886–1895.
 Owens, Ira S. Greene County Soldiers in the Late War (Dayton, OH:  Christian Publishing House), 1884.
 Reid, Whitelaw. Ohio in the War: Her Statesmen, Her Generals, and Soldiers (Cincinnati, OH: Moore, Wilstach, & Baldwin), 1868. 
 Stipp, Joseph Asbury. The History and Service of the 154th Ohio Volunteer Infantry (Toledo, OH:  Hadley & Fullagar), 1896.  [reprinted in 1980]
Attribution

External links
 Ohio in the Civil War: 154th Ohio Volunteer Infantry by Larry Stevens

Military units and formations established in 1864
Military units and formations disestablished in 1864
1864 disestablishments in Ohio
Units and formations of the Union Army from Ohio
1864 establishments in Ohio